SungWon Cho (born December 9, 1990), also known by his internet pseudonym ProZD, is an American voice actor and YouTuber. On his YouTube channel, Cho produces short comedy skits, unboxing videos, and reviews of board games and snack foods. He is also known for playing Detective Joe Furuya in Anime Crimes Division and for his many voice acting roles, including FL4K from Borderlands 3, Holst Sigiswald Goneril from Fire Emblem Warriors: Three Hopes and Ratatoskr from God of War Ragnarök.

Early life
SungWon Cho was born to Korean parents in Minnesota on December 9, 1990, and later moved to DeWitt, Michigan. He started voice acting in high school when he voiced different characters on a friend's radio plays. He attended Michigan State University, where he frequently acted in live performances and graduated in 2012 with a degree in Media Information and Technology. In 2012, after graduating, he described himself as being "in a creative rut" and taught English as a second language to Korean immigrant students.

Career
In October 2012, Cho began daily posting voice content to Tumblr, building an audience and eventually going viral with a video of him singing "Let It Go" from Frozen as Goofy. His first foray into professional voice acting occurred when voice director Deven Mack saw one of his YouTube videos and had him audition for Apotheon, where he ended up securing the role of the main villain Zeus. He remained active on Vine until the 2016 announcement of their shutdown and was also a finalist for the 9th Shorty Awards for Vine of the Year. Cho shifted his focus to his YouTube channel, his audience following from Vine and having his work often appear on the frontpage of Reddit.

In 2017 Cho starred in his first live action role as the main character, Detective Joe Furuya, in Crunchyroll's Anime Crimes Division, for which he was nominated for Best Acting in a Comedy for the 8th Streamy Awards. In mid-2018 Creative Artists Agency reached out and signed him coinciding with an already planned move to Los Angeles to continue his career as a voice actor. Soon after he was cast in the multi-ethnic Rooster Teeth series Gen:Lock and told NewsWeek's Phillip Martinez, "Voice acting gives me a lot more freedom because I'm not limited by my physical appearance. I can voice all sorts all different sort of characters."

Cho's presence on YouTube grew throughout this time with his channel exceeding 3.75 million subscribers and most of his income between voice acting work coming from sponsorships and ad revenue. His videos are intentionally low-budget and often feature recurring universes with their own casts of characters, including an anime parody ("The Tomoko Chairem Anime Canon") and a role-playing game parody ("King Dragon"), through which he pokes fun at common gaming and anime cliches and tropes. He continued to expand these existing storylines that had originally started on Vine, as well as creating a Let's Play channel Press Buttons n Talk with his friend Alex Mankin.  In 2019 Cho voiced the character FL4K in the popular video game Borderlands 3. He has been a fan favorite in the anime community being a frequent guest at conventions and presenting for the Crunchyroll Anime Awards.

Personal life
In October 2015, Cho became engaged to Anne Marie Salter, whom he had met through an online Super Mario fan fiction community. They were married on May 28, 2016. They have two cats named Effie and Sophie who are seen in Cho's videos at times. 

He came up with the username "ProZD" in elementary school, and said that he would not disclose what it means as "it's so embarrassing that even my wife doesn't know." On April 26, 2022, Cho tweeted that he had finally revealed the meaning of the username to his wife after being together for fourteen years.

Filmography

Film

Television

Web series

Video games

Awards and nominations

References

External links

1990 births
Living people
American male actors of Korean descent
American male video game actors
American male voice actors
American YouTubers
Funimation
English-language YouTube channels
Male actors from Minnesota
Michigan State University alumni
Vine (service) celebrities
21st-century American male actors